OGLE-LMC-CEP0227 is an eclipsing binary and Cepheid variable star, pulsating every 3.8 days. The star, in the Large Magellanic Cloud, was the first Cepheid star system found to be orbiting exactly edge on.

The OGLE-LMC-CEP0227 system contains two stars which orbit each other almost exactly 'edge on' to the line of sight from the Earth. This unique configuration has allowed astronomers to refine their understanding of classical Cepheid variable stars. Studies of this system have allowed astronomers to measure the Cepheid mass with unprecedented accuracy. There is still disagreement over whether the pulsational properties accurately match the mass derived from the observed orbit.
 

Notes

References

Stars in the Large Magellanic Cloud
Classical Cepheid variables
Mensa (constellation)
J04521567-7014313

Algol variables
\
Extragalactic stars
F-type supergiants
G-type bright giants